Nebraska Highway 61 is a highway in western Nebraska. The southern terminus of Nebraska Highway 61 is at the Kansas border south of Benkelman, where the highway continues south as K-161. The northern terminus is at the South Dakota border north of Merriman, where the highway continues north as South Dakota Highway 73.

Route description
Nebraska Highway 61 begins at the Kansas border south of Benkelman.  It goes north through farmland for one mile (1.6 km), then intersects U.S. Highway 34, with which it overlaps through Benkelman.  It goes north from Benkelman to Enders Reservoir State Recreation Area, where it intersects U.S. Highway 6.  They overlap north, then west into Imperial.  At Imperial, Highway 61 turns north and continues north until an intersection with Nebraska Highway 23, where Highway 61 and Highway 23 turn west to go to Grant.  At Grant, Highway 61 goes north and continues north until Interstate 80 at Ogallala.  At I-80, an overlap with U.S. Highway 26 begins and they go north across the South Platte River and intersect U.S. Highway 30.

Nebraska Highway 61, U.S. 26 and U.S. 30 then go west out of Ogallala, then Highway 61 and U.S. 26 turn north.  Three miles later, U.S. 26 goes west while Highway 61 goes east.  Highway 61 then turns north to cross the North Platte River via Kingsley Dam at the eastern end of Lake McConaughy.  It then intersects Nebraska Highway 92 and the two highways overlap as they enter the Sand Hills until Arthur.  After Arthur, Highway 61 goes north until Nebraska Highway 2.  They overlap going west into Hyannis, then Highway 61 continues north until Merriman.  At Merriman, Highway 61 intersects U.S. Highway 20 and overlap in town.  Highway 61 continues north from Merriman past the Bowring Ranch State Historical Park and ends at the South Dakota border.

Major intersections

References

External links

Nebraska Roads: NE 61-80

061
Transportation in Dundy County, Nebraska
Transportation in Chase County, Nebraska
Transportation in Perkins County, Nebraska
Transportation in Keith County, Nebraska
Transportation in Arthur County, Nebraska
Transportation in Grant County, Nebraska
Transportation in Cherry County, Nebraska